Juniperus gracilior is a species of conifer in the cypress family, Cupressaceae. It is endemic to the Caribbean island of Hispaniola, where there are localized populations in both Haiti and the Dominican Republic.

Common names
Its Spanish-language common name is sabina; its Haitian Creole name is cèdre.

Taxonomy
There are three subspecies; all three are considered rare. The typical variety is known only from a locality near Constanza, Valle del Jaque; var. ekmanii is recorded from Morne la Selle and Morne la Visite, although the latter subpopulation is now thought to be extinct; and var. urbaniana appears to have been reduced to inaccessible areas although viable populations were recorded in 1984 in Pic la Selle.

Habitat
They grow in humid forest habitat alongside palms and ferns.

References

gracilior
Trees of the Dominican Republic
Trees of Haiti
Taxonomy articles created by Polbot